Craig Stuart King (born 6 October 1990) is a professional footballer who plays for Northern Premier League side Matlock Town, where he plays as a winger. Born in England, he represented Scotland at youth international level.

Club career
Born in Chesterfield, Derbyshire, King started his career at Leicester City where he came through their youth academy alongside Joe Mattock, Max Gradel, Andy King (unrelated), and Luke O'Neill, he signed a two-year pro-contract on 2 September 2008.

King made a match squad for the 1st time in Leicester's 3–0 Football League Trophy victory over Hartlepool United, however he was an unused substitute on that occasion. However, he did make his debut the following round as a half time substitute replacing Steve Howard against Lincoln City.

On 17 September 2009, King joined Hereford United on a one-month loan, and scored within six minutes of his debut in a 2–0 win over Accrington Stanley. On Monday 19 October, King extended his loan at Hereford until the end of the current season.

On 11 November 2010, King Northampton Town on a one-month loan deal.

On 21 May 2011 he was released from Leicester City and in June joined AFC Telford United.

In February 2015, he joined Bradford Park Avenue for an undisclosed fee.

In May 2016 he joined Salford City.

In May 2017 he joined Gainsborough Trinity.

In September 2020 he appeared for Frickley Athletic in a pre-season friendly against Mickleover. Soon after in June 2021, he joined the West Yorkshire club on a permanent deal. After appearing in a number of pre-season games, he returned to Derbyshire.

International career
On 18 May 2009 King was called up to the Scotland under-19 squad for the UEFA European Championships Elite round, to be held at Bramall Lane, Sheffield.

References

External links
Craig King's profile on LCFC.co.uk

1991 births
Living people
Footballers from Chesterfield
English footballers
Scottish footballers
Association football forwards
Leicester City F.C. players
Hereford United F.C. players
Northampton Town F.C. players
AFC Telford United players
Bradford (Park Avenue) A.F.C. players
Buxton F.C. players
Worksop Town F.C. players
Salford City F.C. players
Gainsborough Trinity F.C. players
Alfreton Town F.C. players
Matlock Town F.C. players
Scotland youth international footballers
English Football League players
National League (English football) players
Northern Premier League players